Old Turkic (also East Old Turkic, Orkhon Turkic language, Old Uyghur) is the earliest attested form of the Common Turkic languages, found in Göktürk and Uyghur Khaganate inscriptions dating from about the eighth to the 13th century. It is the oldest attested member of the Siberian Turkic branch of Turkic, which is extant in the modern Western Yugur language. It is not the ancestor of the Uyghur language; the contemporaneous ancestor of Uyghur was one of the Middle Turkic languages, later giving rise to Chagatai.

Old Turkic is attested in a number of scripts, including the Old Turkic script, the Old Uyghur alphabet, the Brahmi script, and the Manichaean script.

Old Turkic often refers not to a single language, but collectively to the closely related and mutually intelligible stages of various Common Turkic languages spoken during the late first millennium.

Sources

The sources of Old Turkic are divided into two corpora:

the 8th to 10th century Orkhon inscriptions in Mongolia and the Yenisey basin (Orkhon Turkic, or Old Turkic proper).
9th to 13th century Uyghur manuscripts from Gansu and Xinjiang (Old Uyghur), in various scripts including Brahmi, the Manichaean, Syriac and Sogdian alphabets, treating religious (Buddhist, Manichaean and Church of the East), legal, literary, folkloric and astrological material, as well as personal correspondence.

Writing systems

The Old Turkic script (also known variously as Göktürk script, Orkhon script, Orkhon-Yenisey script) is the alphabet used by the Göktürks and other early Turkic khanates during the 8th to 10th centuries to record the Old Turkic language.

The script is named after the Orkhon Valley in Mongolia where early 8th-century inscriptions were discovered in an 1889 expedition by Nikolai Yadrintsev.

This writing system was later used within the Uyghur Khaganate. Additionally, a Yenisei variant is known from 9th-century Yenisei Kirghiz inscriptions, and it has likely cousins in the Talas Valley of Turkestan and the Old Hungarian alphabet of the 10th century. Words were usually written from right to left. Variants of the script were found from Mongolia and Xinjiang in the east to the Balkans in the west. The preserved inscriptions were dated to between the 8th and 10th centuries.

Phonology

Vowel roundness are assimilated thorough the word through vowel harmony. Some vowels were considered to occur only in the initial syllable, but they were later found to be in suffixes. Length is distinctive for all vowels; while most of its daughter languages have lost the distinction, many of these preserve it in the case of /e/ with a height distinction, where the long phoneme developed into a more closed vowel than the short counterpart.

Old Turkic is highly restrictive in which consonants words can begin with: words can begin with /b/, /t/, /tʃ/, /k/, /q/, /s/, /ɫ/ and /j/, but they do not usually begin with /p/, /d/, /g/, /ɢ/, /l/, /ɾ/, /n/, /ɲ/, /ŋ/, /m/, /ʃ/, or /z/. The only exceptions are 𐰤𐰀 (ne, “what, which”) and its derivatives, and some early assimilations of word-initial /b/ to /m/ preceding a nasal in a word such as 𐰢𐰤 (men, “I”).

Nominal suffixes
This is a partial list of nominal suffixes attested to in Old Turkic and known usages.

Denominal
The following have been classified by Gerard Clauson as denominal noun suffixes.

Deverbal
The following have been classified by Gerard Clauson as deverbal suffixes.

Literary works
 Uyuk-Tarlak inscription (date unknown) by an unknown writer (in Yenisei Kyrgyz)
 Elegest inscription (date unknown) by an unknown writer (in Yenisei Kyrgyz)
 Orkhon Inscriptions (732 and 735) by Yollıg Khagan (in Orkhon Turkic)
 Bain Tsokto inscriptions (716) by an unknown writer (in Orkhon Turkic)
 Ongin inscription (between 716 and 735) by an unknown writer (in Orkhon Turkic)
 Kul-chur inscription (between 723 and 725) a writer called "Ebizter" (in Orkhon Turkic)
 Altyn Tamgan Tarhan inscription (724) by an unknown writer (in Orkhon Turkic)
 Tariat inscriptions (between 753 and 760) by an unknown writer (in Old Uyghur)
 Choiti-Tamir inscriptions (between 753 and 756) by an unknown writer (in Old Uyghur)
 Sükhbaatar inscriptions (8th century) by an unknown writer (in Old Uyghur)
 Bombogor inscription (8th century) by an unknown writer (in Old Uyghur)
 Book of Divination (9th century) by an unknown writer (in Old Uyghur)

See also
 Old Turkic script
 Proto-Turkic
 Orkhon Turkic language

References

Further reading

Noten zu den alttürkischen Inschriften der Mongolei und Sibiriens (1898)
Ö.D. Baatar, Old Turkic Script, Ulan-Baator (2008), 
M. Erdal, Old Turkic word formation: A functional approach to the lexicon, Turcologica, Harassowitz (1991), .
M. Erdal, Old Turkic, in: The Turkic Languages, eds. L. Johanson & E.A. Csato, Routledge, London (1998), 
M. Erdal, A Grammar of Old Turkic, Handbook of Oriental Studies, Section 8 Uralic & Central Asia, Brill, Leiden (2004), .

L. Johanson, A History of Turkic, in: The Turkic Languages, eds. L. Johanson & E.A. Csato, Routledge, London (1998), 
Talat Tekin, A Grammar of Orkhon Turkic'', Uralic and Altaic Series Vol. 69, Indiana University Publications, Mouton and Co. (1968). (review: Gerard Clauson, Bulletin of the School of Oriental and African Studies, University of London, 1969); Routledge Curzon (1997), .

External links 
Old Turkic inscriptions (with translations into English), reading lessons and tutorials
Turkic Inscriptions of Orkhon Valley (with translations into Turkish)
VATEC, pre-Islamic Old Turkic electronic corpus at uni-frankfurt.de.
A Grammar of Old Turkic by Marcel Erdal
Old Turkic (8th century) funerary inscription (W. Schulze)
Kuli Chor inscription complete text
Tonyukuk inscription complete text
Kul Tigin inscription complete text
Bilge Qaghan inscription complete text
Eletmiš Yabgu (Ongin) inscription complete text
Bayanchur Khan inscription complete text
Ongin inscriptions by Gerard Clauson
Timeline of Turkic Languages (Turkish)

Languages attested from the 8th century
Agglutinative languages
Turkic languages
Extinct languages of Asia
Göktürks